Columbus East High School (CEHS) is one of three high schools in Columbus, Indiana.  East is a member of the Hoosier Hills Conference in athletics and has a total of 5 IHSAA state championships.  It was founded in 1972 due to the growing educational demands of the community.  As the population of the community rose, Columbus High School could not support all school age students.  Columbus East was constructed and Columbus High School became Columbus North High School.  The principal of Columbus East is Mark Howard Newell.

Athletics
The Columbus East Olympians competes in the Hoosier Hills Conference. The school colors are orange and brown. The following IHSAA sanctioned sports are offered:

Baseball (boys)
Basketball (girls & boys)
Cross country (girls & boys)
Football (boys)
State champion - 1979, 2013, 2017
Golf (girls & boys)
Gymnastics (girls)
State champion - 1990
Soccer (girls & boys)
Softball (girls)
Swimming (girls & boys)
Girls state champion - 1983
Tennis (girls & boys)
Track (girls & boys)
Volleyball (girls)
Wrestling (boys)

See also
 List of high schools in Indiana
 Hoosier Hills Conference
 Columbus, Indiana

References

External links

Columbus East High School

Images of CEHS

Public high schools in Indiana
Educational institutions established in 1972
Columbus, Indiana
Schools in Bartholomew County, Indiana
Modernist architecture in Indiana
1972 establishments in Indiana